Clytie is the name of various figures in Greek mythology.

Clytie may also refer to:

 Clytie Hine (1887–1983), Australian-born operatic soprano and voice teacher
 Clytie Jessop (1929–2017), British-based Australian actress, gallerist, painter, screenwriter and film director
 Clytie (moth), a moth genus
 , a World War II US Navy submarine tender

Feminine given names